Hy is a name used as a given name, nickname, or surname. It most commonly appears as a masculine given name, or as a nickname for people with given names such as Hyman or Henry. It is also a Vietnamese surname. Notable people with this name include:

First name

Arts
 Hy Eisman (born 1927), American cartoonist
 Hy Hintermeister, pseudonym of:
 John Henry Hintermeister (1869–1945), Swiss-born American artist, father of Henry
 Henry Hintermeister (1887–1970), American painter and illustrator, son of John Henry
 Hy Mayer (1868–1954), German-American cartoonist and animator
 Hy Sandham (1842–1910), Canadian painter and illustrator

Entertainment
 Hy Anzell (1923–2003), American actor
 Hy Averback (1920–1997), American actor, producer and director
 Hy Brown (1910–2010), American producer of radio and television programs
 Hy Gardner (1908–1989), American entertainment reporter and syndicated columnist
 Hy Hazell (1919–1970), British actress
 Hy Heath (1890–1965), American entertainer, songwriter, composer and author
 Hy Hollinger (1918–2015), American trade journalist and studio publicist
 Hy Kraft (1899–1975), American screenwriter, playwright, and theatrical producer
 Hy Lit (1934–2007), American disc jockey
 Hy Pyke (1935–2006), American character actor
 Hy Weiss (1923–2007), American record producer
 Hy Zaret (1907–2007), American lyricist and composer

Photography
 Hy Hirsh (1911–1961), American photographer
 Hy Peskin (1915–2005), American photographer

Sports
 Hy Buller (1926–1968), Canadian-born ice hockey player
 Hy Cohen (1931–2021), American baseball pitcher
 Hy Gotkin (1922–2004), American basketball player
 Hy Gunning (1888–1975), American baseball player
 Hy Myers (1889–1965), American baseball player
 Hy Turkin (1915–1955), American sportswriter, co-editor of the first baseball encyclopedia
 Hy Vandenberg (1906–1994), American baseball player

Other
 Hy Kloc (1947-2022), American politician in Idaho
 Hy Larner (1913–2002), American gangster
 Hy Spinrad (1934–2015), American astronomer

Last name
 Michael Hồ Đình Hy (1808–1857), Vietnamese martyr
 Patricia Hy-Boulais (born 1965), Cambodian-born former tennis player who represented Hong Kong and Canada

Notes

References